The AFC Women's Asian Cup qualification, is a quadrennial international association football competition for women's, organised by the sport's Asian governing body, the Asian Football Confederation (AFC) to decide the participants for AFC Women's Asian Cup. The competition has been held since 1975. Between 2006 and 2010 the tournament was held biennially, since 2010 it has been held every four years.

History
From 1975 to 2003 the qualification tournament for the final tournament did not exist and the teams were invited to participate. In 2006, the structure saw a major overhaul, with a qualifier tournament introduced for the final championship tournament, allowing all the member nations of AFC to participate. The tournament was also rebranded to 'AFC Women's Asian Cup'.

Since 2006, the qualification tournament has saw various changes in format. In the current format, a total of twelve teams qualify for the final tournament which includes the hosts, top three finishers of previous edition and eight teams who qualify via qualification tournament.

* – Hosts

See also
AFC Asian Cup qualifiers

References

 
AFC Women's Asian Cup